Michael West (born 28 August 1962) is an Australian investigative journalist.

He is the founder of MichaelWestMedia, a news website specialising in investigative journalism in the areas of business, finance, tax, and energy.

Early life and education 
Michael is the son of the late Rod West, a former headmaster of Trinity Grammar School in Sydney. His sister is Catherine West, a British MP.

Prior to journalism, Michael worked for a number of years as a stockbroker.

In November 2016 he received the honorary title of adjunct professor from the University of Sydney.

Journalism career 
West's career in journalism began at The Australian Financial Review. He later wrote a column at The Australian newspaper titled 'Margin Call', for which he was praised by the founder of Crikey, Stephen Mayne; as being 'one of the few financial journalists out there having a go at some of the business practices employed by the likes of Macquarie Bank and Babcock & Brown'. In 2005, he won the business journalism Walkley Award for his article at The Australian titled "Allstate".

He later became business editor and commentator at the Sydney Morning Herald. At the SMH his writing was particularly focused upon the Australian tax interests of multinational companies including Twitter, Google, and Facebook. His stories about tax evasion by multinationals, and corruption in the Australian electricity sector contributed to the establishment of two Senate Inquiries.

In May 2016, Michael was part of an estimated 30 forced redundancies made by Fairfax Media. In an interview, Michael described the situation at Fairfax as 'grim' and accused the publisher of pursuing a click-bait strategy.

See also 
 Crikey
 Stephen Mayne

Links 

 MichaelWest.com.au

References 

1962 births
Australian journalists
Australian newspaper founders
Australian newspaper editors
Living people
Australian newspaper publishers (people)
The Sydney Morning Herald people